Michael E. Gerber (born June 20, 1936) is an American author and founder of Michael E. Gerber Companies, a business skills training company based in Carlsbad, California.

Early life
Michael E. Gerber was born on June 20, 1936, in Elizabeth, NJ. He was the son of Harry Gerber (a furniture salesman) and Helen Gary Gerber Aaron. 

With his first wife, Diana Duncan, Gerber had two children, Axel & Kim. With his second wife, Susan Arndt, he had his middle child, Hillary.  He married his third wife, Ilene (a partner and shareholder in E-Myth Worldwide) in 1985, with whom he had his last two children, Sam and Olivia.  Gerber was remarried to Luz Delia, his fourth wife, in 2006. Luz Delia Gerber was born March 4, 1948.

Writings
The E-Myth (1986) ASIN B004KIC420

Power Point (1992)  

The E-Myth Revisited (1995)  

E-Myth Mastery  (2005) 

Awakening the Entrepreneur Within (2008) 

The E-Myth Enterprise  (2009) 

The Most Successful Small Business in The World  (2010)

E-Myth Vertical Series

The E-Myth Manager  (1998) 

The E-Myth Contractor (2003) 

The E-Myth Physician  (2003) 

The E-Myth Attorney  (2010)  (Co-authored)

The E-Myth Accountant  (2011)  (Co-authored)

The E-Myth Optometrist  (2011)  (Co-authored)

The E-Myth Chiropractor  (2011)  (Co-authored)

The E-Myth Financial Advisor  (2011)  (Co-authored)

The E-Myth Landscape Contractor  (2011)  (Co-authored)

The E-Myth Architect  (2012)  (Co-authored)

The E-Myth Real Estate Brokerage  (2012)  (Co-authored)

The E-Myth Insurance Store  (2013)  (Co-authored)

The E-Myth Dentist  (2014)  (Co-authored)

The E-Myth Nutritionist  (2014)  (Co-authored)

The E-Myth Bookkeeper  (2014)  (Co-authored)

Awards and honors
Named World's Number One Small Business Guru, Inc. Magazine; and
Lifetime Achievement Award, National Academy of Bestselling Authors,
2010.

Events
In 2019, Michael Gerber, alongside Ken Goodrich, presented the opening keynote at the Service World Expo in Las Vegas. The conference was the biggest in HVAC history and saw the launch of Gerber and Goodrich's joint work, E-Myth HVAC Contractor.

Notes

References
 A Conversation with Michael Gerber at Business Week. 
 Tips for Entrepreneurs at INC.
 New Zealand Herald article about Michael Gerber and E-Myth.
 Michael Gerber Interview
 Michael Gerber Interview on Beyond the E-myth

External links

 Business Coaching website 

American business writers
American motivational writers
1936 births
Living people
People from Carlsbad, California
Writers from California
20th-century American non-fiction writers
21st-century American non-fiction writers